Hilton is a small town that lies near the city of Pietemaritzburg in the province of KwaZulu-Natal, South Africa. In 1872 the Reverend William Orde Newnham opened Hilton College on a large estate 7.8km north of the town, which is now one of South Africa's leading private schools.

History 
The woman who named Hilton was Jane Henderson, her husband Joseph Henderson (1825–1899): merchant, banker, financier and  politician. He married Jane Maidstone née Pearson on the 13th Aug 1849 in Pietermaritzburg and accompanied Theophilus Shepstone as adviser to the Transvaal in 1877.

Education  in  Hilton includes Cowan House, a private mixed boarding school for over 300 pupils. The school, founded in  1948 was destroyed in  a fire in 1997 and was rebuilt the same year. Also St. Anne's Diocesan College, Grace College, Hilton college  and Laddsworth Primary School.

Geography 
Organisationally and administratively, it is included in the uMngeni Local Municipality and the larger uMgungundlovu District Municipality.

Hilton is bordered by Garlington Estate to the north, the city of Pietermaritzburg and the suburban area of Chase Valley to the south-east and the village of Cedara to the north-west.

Suburban areas 
The majority of Hilton including the town centre lies to the south of the N3 highway apart from the small suburb of Hilton Gardens which lies to the north of the N3. 

The remaining suburbs of Hilton include Berry Hill, Hiltara Park (portmanteau of Hilton and Cedara), Leonard, Mountain Homes, Mount Michael, Sweetwaters, Winterskloof and World's View.

Transport

Roads
Hilton is mainly accessed by the major N3 highway which is the only freeway that passes through Hilton. The N3 bypasses Hilton to the north and links the town to Howick and Harrismith and further to Johannesburg in the north-west and Pietermaritzburg and Durban in the south-east. Access from the N3 can mainly be obtained through the M80 Hilton Avenue off-ramp (Exit 94) and can alternatively be accessed through the R103 Cedara Road off-ramp (Exit 96) in Cedara. 

Hilton's main road is Hilton Avenue which runs through the town centre and links to the N3 and Hilton College in the north and continues southwards as Dennis Shepstone Drive to Sweetwaters in the south.

The R103 is the other main road that traverses through Hilton. The R103 is the original N3 and served the same function before the construction of the highway. Similarly to the current N3, the R103 was the main road between Durban and Howick via Pietermaritzburg and thus the name of the road being Old Howick Road. The R103 links the town to Cedara, Howick, Mooi River and Estcourt in the north-west and Pietermaritzburg, Camperdown, Cato Ridge, Hillcrest and Durban (via the M13) in the south-east.

References

Further reading 

 The Story of Hilton 

Populated places in the uMngeni Local Municipality